The Milwaukee Project was a program begun in the 1960s designed to improve the IQs and scholastic achievement of children at risk and to study the effects of intellectual stimulation on children from deprived environments.

The Project
Rick Heber of the University of Wisconsin–Madison examined the statistics of districts in the city of Milwaukee. His attention was drawn towards one district, where the residents had the lowest median income and lowest level of education in the city. The unemployment rate was also very high. Although this district contained only 3% of the city's population, 33% of all children who had been labeled "mentally retarded" lived there.

Program
Heber selected 40 newborns from this district. All had a mother with an IQ lower than 75. In many cases the father was absent. The newborns were randomly assigned to an experimental and a control group. Mothers of children in the experimental group received education and vocational rehabilitation.The children attended an onsite Infant/Child Care program where they received a high quality educational program designed to develop language and cognitive skills. They also received three balanced meals a day. They stayed there five days a week, seven hours a day. When the children were six the program ended and the children attended local schools.   Both the experimental group and the control group were tested an equal number of times throughout the project.

Findings
According to Heber and colleagues, by age six all of the children from the experimental group had higher IQs than all of the children from the control group. Mean IQ was 120 in the experimental group and 87 in the control group. After the children left the program their IQs started declining. By the time both groups were ten years old the IQs of the children of the experimental group had decreased to 105. Mean IQ in the control group was 85.

At age 14, the children in the experimental group had a mean IQ ten points above that of the control group, but the scholastic achievement scores of the experimental group were not better than those of the control group. Both groups performed in school as would be expected from children with a mean IQ of 80. For this reason, Arthur Jensen has suggested that the Milwaukee Project did not produce permanent intelligence gains, but that the IQ gains it showed were due to an indirect form of "teaching to the test".

Controversy
The Milwaukee Project's claimed success was celebrated in the popular media and by famous psychologists. However, later in the project Rick Heber, the principal investigator, was discharged from the University of Wisconsin–Madison and convicted and imprisoned for large-scale abuse of federal funding for private gain. Two of Heber's colleagues in the project were also convicted for similar abuses. The project's results were not published in any refereed scientific journals, and Heber did not respond to requests from colleagues for raw data and technical details of the study. Consequently, even the existence of the project as described by Heber has been called into question. Nevertheless, many college textbooks in psychology and education have uncritically reported the project's results.

Citations

References
 
 
 
 
 

Educational research
Educational assessment and evaluation
University of Wisconsin–Madison
Education in Milwaukee
Race and intelligence controversy